Nazzareno Tarantino (born 4 January 1979) is an Italian footballer who plays as a forward for Lucchese in the Serie D.

Career
Throughout his career, he played in the Italian Serie B with Empoli, Crotone, Juve Stabia and Lucchese, just when he started playing as a professional player in the 1995–1996 season.

In 2012, he finishes his contract with Juve Stabia, and he goes to play in the Italian Serie C with the Treviso. In the summer of 2013 he returned to the Lucchese, after 11 seasons, but in the Italian Serie D.

References

External links

1979 births
Sportspeople from Benevento
Living people
Italian footballers
Serie B players
Association football midfielders
Empoli F.C. players
F.C. Crotone players
S.S. Juve Stabia players
Treviso F.B.C. 1993 players
Footballers from Campania